Kenel is an unincorporated community in Corson County, in the U.S. state of South Dakota.

History
A post office called Kenel was established in 1914, and remained in operation until 1963. The community has the name of Father Martin Kenel, a local priest. The main regulation reservoir of the Standing Rock Rural Water System, the $3.6 million Kline Butte Storage Reservoir, is located southwest of Kenel.

References

Unincorporated communities in Corson County, South Dakota
Unincorporated communities in South Dakota